The Archdeacon of Bolton is a senior ecclesiastical officer within the Diocese of Manchester. The role was created by an Order of the Bishop on 20 May 1982.

As archdeacon, he or she is responsible for the disciplinary supervision of the clergy  within the archdeaconry of Bolton, which consists six area deaneries: Bolton, Bury, Deane, Radcliffe and Prestwich, Rossendale and Walmsley. The post is currently held by Jean Burgess.

List of archdeacons
1982–1985: Fred Hoyle (afterwards archdeacon emeritus)
1985–1992: Bill Brison (afterwards archdeacon emeritus)
1992–2001: Lorys Davies (afterwards archdeacon emeritus)
2002–2008: John Applegate (afterwards archdeacon emeritus)
2008–2018: David Bailey (archdeacon emeritus since February 2018)
25 March 2018present: Jean Burgess (also Archdeacon of Salford since 1 July 2020)

References

Lists of Anglicans
 
Lists of English people
Archdeacon of Bolton